Grete Wilhelm (1887–1942) was an Austrian painter.

Biography
Wilhelm née Hujber was born  in Radenci, Slovenia on 9 July 1887. She was known for her landscape and genre paintings. She died on 24 June 1942 in Vienna.

Gallery

References

External links 
 

 

 
1887 births 
1942 deaths
20th-century Austrian women artists